Karkat is a Village in Badakhshan Province in northeastern Afghanistan.

References 

Populated places in Wakhan District
Wakhan